O. microlepis may refer to:

Ophisops microlepis
Opsaridium microlepis 
Oxyurichthys microlepis
Oxyurichthyes microlepis